Héroes verdaderos is a 2010 Mexican animated biopic adventure film, that chronicles the adventures of the heroes of Mexicans independence Miguel Hidalgo and José María Morelos. In 2011 the movie was awarded with The Silver Goddesses.

Plot
Two young men, a Creole and a mestizo, who are friends since childhood are involved in the independence movement as beyond the hatred of Xama, half brother of the half-blood.

Cast
José Lavat as Miguel Hidalgo y Costilla
Víctor Trujillo as José María Morelos y Pavón
Jacqueline Andere as Josefina
Mario Filio as Ignacio Allende
Pepe Vilchis as Juan Aldama
Kalimba Marichal as Mixcóatl
Sandra Echeverría as Tonatzin

External links

2010 animated films
2010 films
2010s adventure films
Films set in Mexico
Mexican animated films
2010s Spanish-language films
Films set in the 1810s
2010s Mexican films

References